Alejandro "Àlex" Gómez Comes, (born 8 October 1972) is a Spanish football manager.

Before starting his senior coaching career in Hong Kong, he has held various positions the youth academy of FC Barcelona.

Coaching career
Born in L'Ametlla de Mar, Tarragona, Catalonia, Gómez started coaching at La Masia, the youth academy of FC Barcelona, in 2007.

In the summer of 2011, Gómez was appointed as the coach of Barça's Alevín C.

Kitchee
Gómez signed a 1-year contract with Hong Kong top-tier division club Kitchee on 21 May 2013, with his contract formally starts on 30 June 2013. His arrival to Kitchee was due to former coach Josep Gombau's departure to A-League club Adelaide United.

However, Gómez left Kitchee in November 2013.

Managerial stats

References

Living people
Spanish football managers
Sportspeople from the Province of Tarragona
1972 births
Kitchee SC managers
Alex Gomez
FC Barcelona non-playing staff
Spanish expatriate sportspeople in Hong Kong
Spanish expatriate sportspeople in Thailand
Spanish expatriate football managers
Expatriate football managers in Hong Kong
Expatriate football managers in Thailand